An end-of-life product (EOL product) is a product at the end of the product lifecycle which prevents users from receiving updates, indicating that the product is at the end of its useful life (from the vendor's point of view). At this stage, a vendor stops the marketing, selling, or provisioning of parts, services, or software updates for the product. The vendor may simply intend to limit or end support for the product. In the specific case of product sales, a vendor may employ the more specific term "end-of-sale" ("EOS"). All users can continue to access discontinued products, but cannot receive security updates and technical support. The time-frame after the last production date depends on the product and relates to the expected product lifetime from a customer's point of view.  Different lifetime examples include toys from fast food chains (weeks or months), mobile phones (3 years) and cars (10 years).

Product support
Product support during EOL varies by product. For hardware with an expected lifetime of 10 years after production ends, the support includes spare parts, technical support and service. Spare-part lifetimes are price-driven due to increasing production costs, as high-volume production sites are often closed when series production ends. Manufacturers may also continue to offer parts and services even when it is not profitable, to demonstrate good faith and to retain a reputation of durability. Minimum service lifetimes are also mandated by law for some products in some jurisdictions. Alternatively, some producers may discontinue maintenance of a product in order to force customers to upgrade to newer products.

Computing
In the computing field, the concept of end-of-life has significance in the production, supportability and purchase of software and hardware products. For example, Microsoft marked Windows 98 for end-of-life on June 30, 2006. Software produced after that date may not work for it. Microsoft's product Office 2007 (released on November 30, 2006), for instance, is not installable on Windows Me or any prior versions of Windows. Depending on the vendor, end-of-life may differ from end of service life, which has the added distinction that a vendor of systems or software will no longer provide maintenance, troubleshooting or other support. Such software which is abandoned service-wise by the original developers is also called abandonware. Sometimes, software vendors hand over software on end-of-life, end-of-sale or end-of-service to the user community, to allow them to provide service and further upgrades themselves. Notable examples are the web browser Netscape Communicator, which was released in 1998 by Netscape Communications under an open-source license to the public, and the office suite StarOffice which was released by Sun Microsystems in October 2000 as OpenOffice.org (LibreOffice forked from this). Sometimes, software communities continue the support on end-of-official-support even without endorsement of the original developer, such developments are then called unofficial patches, existing for instance for Windows 98 or many PC games.

See also
 Backward compatibility
 End of Life Vehicles Directive, a directive of the European Union
 Digital obsolescence
 Planned obsolescence
 Phase-out of fossil fuel vehicles#Unintended side-effects
 Product life cycle management
 Product lifetime
 Product change notification
 Service life
 Software release life cycle

References

 JEDEC standard EOL : JESD48
 JEDEC standard PCN : JESD46

Further reading
 Scharnhorst, W., Althaus, H.-J., Hilty, L. and Jolliet, O.: Environmental assessment of End-of-Life treatment options for an GSM 900 antenna rack, Int J LCA., 11 (6), pp: 426–436. 2006
 Scharnhorst, W., Althaus, H.-J., Classen, M., Jolliet, O. and Hilty, L. M.: End of Life treatment of second generation mobile phone networks: strategies to reduce the environmental impact, Env Imp Ass Rev 25 (5), pp: 540–566. 2005

External links 
 endoflife.date

Product expiration
Software release